= Escadron =

An escadron, in French-speaking countries, may refer to:

- Squadron (army)
- Squadron (aviation)
- Squadron (naval)
- In military aviation, the equivalent of a:
  - Wing (military aviation unit) (in countries such as the United States) or;
  - Group (military aviation unit) (in most Commonwealth air forces)
